The Township of Farmington is one of thirty-seven townships in Washington County, Arkansas, USA. As of the 2000 census, its total population was 3605.

Geography

Cities, towns, villages
Farmington

Cemeteries
The township contains two cemeteries.

Major routes
 US Route 62
 Arkansas Highway 170

References
 United States Census Bureau 2008 TIGER/Line Shapefiles
 United States Board on Geographic Names (GNIS)
 United States National Atlas

External links
 US-Counties.com
 City-Data.com

Townships in Washington County, Arkansas
Townships in Arkansas